Waraqayuq (Quechua waraqa sack, -yuq a suffix to indicate ownership, "the one with a sack", Hispanicized spelling Huaracayoc) or Warak'ayuq (warak'a sling or slingshot, "the one with a sling") is a mountain with an archaeological site of the same name in the Cordillera Blanca in the Andes of Peru, about  high. It is situated in the Ancash Region, Huari Province, Chavin de Huantar District, east of the mountain Yanamaray.

References 

Mountains of Peru
Mountains of Ancash Region
Archaeological sites in Ancash Region
Archaeological sites in Peru